4th Guards Brigade may refer to:

German
 4th Guards Cavalry Brigade (German Empire)
 4th Guards Artillery Brigade (German Empire)
 4th Guards Infantry Brigade (German Empire)

Others
 4th Guards Brigade (Croatia)
 4th (Guards) Brigade designation for the British 4th Infantry Brigade at the outbreak of World War I
 4th Guards Brigade (United Kingdom)